The Piper at the Gates of Dawn is the debut studio album by Pink Floyd.

Piper at the Gates of Dawn or The Piper at the Gates of Dawn may also refer to:

"The Piper at the Gates of Dawn", the seventh chapter of the book The Wind in the Willows
"The Piper at the Gates of Dawn", Episode 12, series 1 of TV series The Wind in the Willows (a standalone adaption of the chapter, omitted from the pilot full book adaptation)
"Piper at the Gates of Dawn", a song by Van Morrison, first released on his album The Healing Game
"Piper at the Gates of Dawn", a short story by John Middleton Murry Jr. (as Richard Cowper)
"Piper at the Gates of Dawn", a track on The Waterboys' album Where the Action Is